The 1989 Commonwealth Heads of Government Meeting was the 11th Meeting of the Heads of Government of the Commonwealth of Nations.  It was held in Kuala Lumpur, Malaysia, between 18 October 1989 and 24 October 1989, and was hosted by that country's Prime Minister, Mahathir Mohamad.

It was dominated by the issue of sanctions on South Africa, with Britain (represented by Foreign Secretary John Major) being the only country to oppose them, on the grounds that they would end up hurting poorer South Africans far more than the apartheid regime at which they were aimed. The summit ended acrimoniously, with British Prime Minister Margaret Thatcher controversially and against established precedent issuing a second final communiqué stating Britain's opposition to sanctions.

The Langkawi Declaration on the Environment was agreed and issued at the CHOGM.

References

1989
Diplomatic conferences in Malaysia
20th-century diplomatic conferences
1989 conferences
1989 in international relations
1989 in Malaysia
Malaysia and the Commonwealth of Nations
 
October 1989 events in Asia